Downtown Monett Historic District is a national historic district located at Monett, Barry County, Missouri. It encompasses 35 contributing buildings in the central business district of Monett.  The district developed between about 1892 and 1947, and includes representative examples of Classical Revival and Streamline Moderne architecture. Notable buildings include the Ozark Fruit Growers Association (1926), Armstrong and Sons Grocers (1914), Wilson Opera House (1893), Zumwalt Lunch Stand (1928), Callaway Furniture Store (1916), Hoberg Building (1893), First National Bank (c. 1900), Main Variety (1945), Bill Martin's Chevrolet (c. 1940), Monett State Bank (c. 1903), City Hall and Fire Station (c. 1929), Gas Service Company and Battery Factory (1917), Post Office (1936), and Masonic Temple (1922).

It was added to the National Register of Historic Places in 2014.

References

Historic districts on the National Register of Historic Places in Missouri
Neoclassical architecture in Missouri
Buildings and structures in Barry County, Missouri
National Register of Historic Places in Barry County, Missouri